The Argo Avenger is an eight-wheeled all terrain vehicle built by Argo.
On land the vehicle is steered turning the wheels on the two sides of the vehicle at different speeds.
On water the vehicle can be propelled either by the treads on the tires, or by an outboard motor.
Optionally, on very loose or swampy land a pair of large band tracks can be strung over the vehicles' wheels.

In November 2009 volunteers in twelve communities in Nunavut were equipped with an Argo Avenger for local search and rescue.
The vehicles supplied in Nunavut will be equipped with bandtracks.
The twelve communities are; Arviat, Cambridge Bay, Igloolik, Pond Inlet, Taloyoak, Rankin Inlet, Sanikiluaq, Pangnirtung, Kugluktuk, Iqaluit, Naujaat and Baker Lake.

Military operators

 Pakistan Army

References

Transport in Nunavut
ATVs
Eight-wheeled vehicles